Gabriel José Ferreira Mesquita (born 24 September 1998), simply known as Gabriel Mesquita, is a Brazilian footballer who plays as a goalkeeper for Cruzeiro.

Club career
Born in Maceió, Alagoas, Gabriel made his senior debut with Athletico Paranaense on 31 March 2019, starting in a 4–1 away loss against Londrina for the year's Campeonato Paranaense.

References

External links
Athletico Paranaense official profile 

1998 births
Living people
People from Maceió
Brazilian footballers
Association football goalkeepers
Campeonato Paranaense players
Club Athletico Paranaense players
Guarani FC players
Cruzeiro Esporte Clube players
Sportspeople from Alagoas